Bulbophyllum sect. Aeschynanthoides is a section of the genus Bulbophyllum.

Description
Species in this section have small pseudobulbs with the rhizome being thicker than the pseudobulbs

Distribution
Plants from this section are found from China to Southeast Asia.

Species
Bulbophyllum section  Aeschynanthoides comprises the following species:

References

Orchid subgenera